Maurice Le Scouëzec, was born in Mans on 1 October 1881 and died at Douarnenez on the 1 May 1940. He was a French artist, engraver, illustrator and writer.

Biography
His son Gwenc’hlan Le Scouëz has written a biography of his father.

Born in Le Mans, Maurice Le Scouëzec's father was a Breton and worked as an inspector for the "Chemins de fer de l'Ouest". Maurice Le Scouëzec frequented the artist's quarter in Paris of Montparnasse and then set off on various voyages around the world on tall ships. He finally returned to France and died in Douarnenez. In an eventful life he had been a sailor, soldier, globe-trotter/adventurer and a painter and worked with painters such as Pablo Picasso and Amedeo Modigliani.

Works executed during times spent in Africa
During his stays in the Sudan and Madagascar he completed many evocative and realistic paintings depicting life in African villages.
He exhibited his canvases at the ""Salon d’automne".  He completed many paintings depicting Brittany.

The frescoes at  Pont-d'Ouilly
[[File:Maurice Le Scouezec Saint Roch guérit les pestiférés (fresque chapelle Saint-Roch à Pont d'Ouilly).jpg|thumb|centre|300px|"Saint Roch guérit les pestiférés. 1932 fresco at Pont-d'Ouilly's Saint-Roch chapel. Painting depicts Saint Roch curing a victim of the plague]]
In 1932, Le Scouëzec was commissioned to paint nine frescoes for the chapel Saint-Roch at Pont-d'Ouilly. These depicted scenes from the saint's life. Eight frescoes adorned the chapel's walls and depicted the saint's birth, his refusal of meat on a Friday, the saint distributing toys, the saint leaving for Rome on a pilgrimage, his reception at Aquapendente, the saint sick in a forest, the saint curing the victims of the plague and then in prison. A ninth fresco is located behind the altar and depicts Saint Roch et les Anges.  The frescoes on the chapel's lateral walls were restored by the Polish artist Marek Sobczyk between 1982-1984, and in 2003  Jean Bonavita worked on restoring the frescoes on the south wall.

Decoration of the "salle des fêtes" in the  Douarnenez town hall
In 1938 he painted two frescoes for the "salle des fêtes", one entitled Le village de Pouldavid" and the second  La plage du Ris. These were classified as "monument historique" in 1997.

Works executed in Brittany

References

1881 births
1940 deaths
19th-century French painters
French male painters
20th-century French painters
20th-century French male artists
19th-century French male artists